is an ancient Buddhist temple located in Asakusa, Tokyo, Japan. It is Tokyo's oldest temple, and one of its most significant. Formerly associated with the Tendai sect of Buddhism, it became independent after World War II. It is dedicated to Kannon, the bodhisattva of compassion, and is the most widely visited religious site in the world with over 30 million visitors annually. Adjacent to the temple is a five-story pagoda, the Asakusa Shinto shrine, as well as many shops with traditional goods in the Nakamise-dōri.

The temple has a titanium tiled roof that maintains the historic image but is stronger and lighter.

History 

The temple is dedicated to the bodhisattva Kannon (Avalokiteśvara). According to legend, a statue of the Kannon was found in the Sumida River in 628 AD by two fishermen, brothers Hinokuma Hamanari and Hinokuma Takenari. The chief of their village, Hajino Nakamoto, recognized the sanctity of the statue and enshrined it by remodeling his own house into a small temple in Asakusa so that the villagers could worship Kannon.

The first temple was founded in 645 AD, which makes it the oldest temple in Tokyo. In the early years of the Tokugawa shogunate, Tokugawa Ieyasu designated Sensō-ji as tutelary temple of the Tokugawa clan.

The Nishinomiya Inari shrine is located within the precincts of Sensō-ji and a torii identifies the entry into the hallowed ground of the shrine. A bronze plaque on the gateway structure lists those who contributed to the construction of the torii, which was erected in 1727 (Kyōhō 12, 11th month).
 
During World War II, the temple was bombed and destroyed during the 10 March air raid on Tokyo. It was rebuilt later and is a symbol of rebirth and peace to the Japanese people. In the courtyard there is a tree that was hit by a bomb in the air raids, and it had regrown in the husk of the old tree and is a similar symbol to the temple itself.

Temple grounds

Sensō-ji is the focus of Tokyo's largest and most popular festival, Sanja Matsuri. This takes place over 3–4 days in late spring, and sees the surrounding streets closed to traffic from dawn until late evening.

Dominating the entrance to the temple is the Kaminarimon or "Thunder Gate". This imposing Buddhist structure features a massive paper lantern dramatically painted in vivid red-and-black tones to suggest thunderclouds and lightning.  Beyond the Kaminarimon is Nakamise-dori with its shops, followed by the Hōzōmon or "Treasure House Gate" which provides the entrance to the inner complex.  Within the precincts stand a stately five-story pagoda and the main hall, devoted to Kannon.

Many tourists, both Japanese and from abroad, visit Sensō-ji every year. Catering to the visiting crowds, the surrounding area has many traditional shops and eating places that feature traditional dishes (hand-made noodles, sushi, tempura, etc.). Nakamise-Dori, the street leading from the Thunder Gate to the temple itself, is lined with small shops selling souvenirs ranging from fans, ukiyo-e (woodblock prints), kimono and other robes, Buddhist scrolls, traditional sweets, to Godzilla toys, t-shirts and mobile phone straps. These shops themselves are part of a living tradition of selling to pilgrims who walked to Sensō-ji.

Within the temple itself, and also at many places on its approach, there are o-mikuji stalls. For a suggested donation of 100 yen, visitors may consult the oracle and divine answers to their questions. Querents shake labelled sticks from enclosed metal containers and read the corresponding answers they retrieve from one of 100 possible drawers.

Within the temple is a quiet contemplative garden kept in the distinctive Japanese style.

Kaminarimon 

The  is the outer of two large entrance gates that ultimately leads to the Sensō-ji (the inner being the Hōzōmon) in Asakusa, Tokyo, Japan. The gate, with its lantern and statues, is popular with tourists. The first gate was built in 941, but the current gate dates from 1960, after the previous gate was destroyed in a fire in 1865.

History 
The Kaminarimon was first built in 941 AD by Taira no Kinmasa, a military commander. It was originally located near Komagata, but it was reconstructed in its current location in 1635. This is believed to be when the gods of wind and thunder were first placed on the gate. The gate has been destroyed many times throughout the ages.  Four years after its relocation, the Kaminarimon burned down, and in 1649 AD Tokugawa Iemitsu rebuilt the gate along with several other of the major structures in the temple complex. The gate burnt to the ground in 1757 AD and again in 1865 AD. The Kaminarimon's current structure was dedicated in December 1960 AD . Ninety-five years after the last fire, Konosuke Matsushita, the founder of Matsushita Electric Industrial Company (now Panasonic), was asked to rebuild the gate. With monetary donations from Matsushita, the gate was rebuilt in 1960.

Features 

Four statues are housed in the Kaminarimon, two in the front alcoves and two on the other side. On the front of the gate, the statues of the Shinto gods Fūjin and Raijin are displayed. Fūjin, the god of wind, is located on the east side of the gate, while Raijin, the god of thunder, is located on the west side. The original sculptures were severely damaged in the fire of 1865, with only the heads being saved, and the statues restored for the gate's 1960 reconstruction.

Two additional statues stand on the reverse of the gate: the Buddhist god Tenryū on the east, and the goddess Kinryū on the west side. These were donated in 1978 to commemorate the 1350th anniversary of the first appearance of the bodhisattva Kannon (Avalokiteśvara) at Asakusa, which led to the founding of Sensō-ji. The statues were carved by then-106-year-old master sculptor Hirakushi Denchū.

A giant red lantern (chōchin) hangs under the center of the gate. The current lantern, the fifth iteration, was built by Takahashi Chōchin K.K in 2013 and has the same metallic base on the bottom as the previous lantern. The base has a name plate that says "Matsushita Denki", an abbreviated form of Panasonic's old Japanese name, Matsushita Denki Sangyo Kabushiki Gaisha. The front of the lantern displays the gate's name, . Painted on the back is the gate's official name, . During festivals such as Sanja Matsuri, the lantern is collapsed to let tall objects pass through the gate.

The characters  on the tablet above the lantern read from right to left and reference the Sensō-ji.

Hozomon 

The  is the inner of two large entrance gates that ultimately leads to the Sensō-ji (the outer being the Kaminarimon) in Asakusa, Tokyo. A two-story gate (nijūmon), the Hōzōmon's second story houses many of the Sensō-ji's treasures. The first story houses two statues, three lanterns and two large sandals.

History 

The Hōzōmon was first built in 942 AD by Taira no Kinmasa. Destroyed by fire in 1631, it was rebuilt by Tokugawa Iemitsu in 1636. It stood for 300 more years until it was once again burned down during the Tokyo air raids of 1945. In 1964, the present steel-reinforced concrete structure was built with a donation of ¥150 million from Yonetarō Motoya.

Since the gate was reconstructed using flame-resistant materials, the upper story of the Hōzōmon stores the Sensō-ji's treasured sutras. These treasures include a copy of the Lotus Sutra that is designated a Japanese National Treasure and the Issai-kyō, a complete collection of Buddhist scriptures that has been designated an Important Cultural Property.

Features 

Unlike the Kaminarimon, which houses four different statues, the Hōzōmon houses two guardian statues that are located on either side of the gate's south face. Because of these statues, the gate was originally called the  before it was renamed the Hōzōmon.

The gate also features three large lanterns. The largest and most prominent lantern is a red chōchin that hangs under the center of the gate's opening. The current iteration of the lantern dates back to 2003 when ¥5 million was donated by the people of Kobunachō. Its donation commemorated the 400th-year-anniversary of the start of the Edo period. All three lanterns are completely removed during festivals such as Sanja Matsuri.

Nakamise-dōri

The  is a street on the approach to the temple. It is said to have come about in the early 18th century, when neighbors of Sensō-ji were granted permission to set up shops on the approach to the temple. However, in May 1885 the government of Tokyo ordered all shop owners to leave. In December of that same year the area was reconstructed in Western-style brick. During the 1923 Great Kantō earthquake many of the shops were destroyed, then rebuilt in 1925 using concrete, only to be destroyed again during the bombings of World War II.

Gallery

See also 
 Buddhist temples in Japan
 Glossary of Japanese Buddhism
 List of Buddhist temples
 List of National Treasures of Japan (writings)

Notes

References
 McClain, James L., John M. Merriman, Kaoru Ugawa and Ugawa Kaoru. (1997).  Edo and Paris: Urban Life and the State in the Early Modern Era. Ithaca: Cornell University Press. ; OCLC 39088759

External links

  
 SensojiTemple.com. English language tourism resource about the buddhist Sensoji Temple in Asakusa, Tokyo, Japan

Asakusa
Buddhist temples in Tokyo
Buildings and structures in Japan destroyed during World War II
Buildings and structures in Taitō